Mefruside (INN) is a diuretic indicated for the treatment of edema and hypertension.

It was developed by Bayer A.G. and is sold under the tradename Baycaron.

References

Diuretics
Sulfonamides
Tetrahydrofurans
Chloroarenes
Carbonic anhydrase inhibitors